Gareth Chapman (born 16 April 1981) is a Welsh rugby union player. A centre, he joined Cardiff RFC in September 2007 from Welsh regional side Newport Gwent Dragons. In May 2010 Chapman joined Newport RFC.

He is currently teaching at Llanwern high school, formally Hartridge High School in Newport.

References

External links
Newport Gwent Dragons profile

Welsh rugby union players
Dragons RFC players
Cardiff RFC players
Newport RFC players
1981 births
Rugby union players from Newport, Wales
Living people
Rugby union centres